Saint Novatus (died c. 151) is an early Christian saint. His feast day is 20 June.

Novatus and his brother, the martyr Timotheus, were the sons of Saint Pudens, and the brothers of Saints Pudentiana and Praxedes. His paternal grandfather was Quintus Cornelius Pudens, the Roman senator, who with his wife, Priscilla, was among St. Peter's earliest converts in Rome and in whose house the Apostle dwelt while in that city.  A portion of the structure of the modern church of Santa Pudenziana (Via Urbana) is thought to be part of the senatorial palace or of the baths built by Novatus.

According to the 5th-century church historian Philostorgius, Novatus was of Phrygian descent.

The city of Novato, California, is named after a local Miwok leader who had probably been given the name of Saint Novatus at his baptism.

References

151 deaths
2nd-century Christian saints
Year of birth unknown